Zoltán Kovács (born 29 October 1984) is a Hungarian football player. He plays for Cypriot club Ypsonas.

References

 
 
 

1984 births
Living people
People from Békéscsaba
Hungarian footballers
Association football goalkeepers
MTK Budapest FC players
BFC Siófok players
Kaposvári Rákóczi FC players
Diósgyőri VTK players
Aris Limassol FC players
Nea Salamis Famagusta FC players
FC Dinamo București players
Újpest FC players
Zalaegerszegi TE players
Vasas SC players
Budafoki LC footballers
Liga I players
Cypriot First Division players
Hungarian expatriate footballers
Expatriate footballers in Cyprus
Hungarian expatriate sportspeople in Cyprus
Expatriate footballers in Romania
Hungarian expatriate sportspeople in Romania
Nemzeti Bajnokság I players
Nemzeti Bajnokság II players
Sportspeople from Békés County
21st-century Hungarian people